Ian Jeffrey Ridley (15 February 1934 – 13 November 2008) was an Australian rules footballer who played for Melbourne in the VFL.

Playing career
Ridley was a rover who was handy around goals and a 5-time premiership player with Melbourne. He topped Melbourne's goalkicking in 1960 with 38 goals and went on to coach the club during the 1970s.

Sports administration career
From 1991 until 1996 he served as the President of Melbourne Football Club. Although a well loved player, he lost his popularity with his huge push for the Demons to merge with Hawthorn. After the merger was defeated, he was replaced with Joseph Gutnick. He was named as an emergency in their official 'Team of the Century'.

See also
Melbourne Football Club/Hawthorn Football Club planned merger

Book

References

External links

1934 births
2008 deaths
Deaths from emphysema
Australian rules footballers from Victoria (Australia)
Melbourne Football Club players
Melbourne Football Club coaches
Melbourne Football Club presidents
Hamilton Imperials Football Club players
Five-time VFL/AFL Premiership players
Melbourne Football Club Premiership players